David Andrew Merris (born 13 October 1980) is an English semi-professional footballer who plays as a defender for Pickering Town.

Career
Born in Rotherham, South Yorkshire, Merris was a member of the youth system of hometown club Rotherham United before joining Guiseley in 1998. He joined Harrogate Town in September 1999, with whom he won the Northern Premier League First Division title in the 2001–02 season. Merris signed for Third Division club York City on 6 August 2003 following a trial. He won York's Clubman of the Year award for the 2004–05 season. Merris signed a new deal with York at the end of the 2004–05 season. He was released by York at the end of the 2005–06 season and subsequently signed for former club Harrogate on 29 June 2006. On 20 March 2008, he joined Guiseley from Harrogate for an undisclosed fee. He was released by the club in May 2012 before signing for Harrogate for the third time on 31 May. Merris joined Northern Premier League Division One North club Ossett Town as a player-coach in June 2014. and was appointed player-assistant manager in November 2014

Career statistics

Honours
Harrogate Town
Northern Premier League First Division: 2001–02

Individual
York City Clubman of the Year: 2004–05

References

External links

1980 births
Living people
Footballers from Rotherham
English footballers
Association football defenders
Rotherham United F.C. players
Guiseley A.F.C. players
Harrogate Town A.F.C. players
York City F.C. players
Ossett Town F.C. players
Northern Premier League players
English Football League players
National League (English football) players
Scarborough Athletic F.C. players